This article concerns the period 459 BC – 450 BC.

References